S. Pangnyu Phom is an Indian politician from Nagaland. He has been elected in Nagaland Legislative Assembly election in 2008, 2013 and 2018 from Longleng constituency as candidate of Bharatiya Janata Party. He was minister of Health and Family welfare in Fourth Neiphiu Rio ministry from 2018.

References 

Living people
Bharatiya Janata Party politicians from Nagaland
Nagaland MLAs 2018–2023
Nationalist Congress Party politicians
Year of birth missing (living people)
People from Longleng district
Naga people